Abdusalom Abdumavlonovich Azizov (Uzbek: Abdusalom Abdumavlonovich Azizov; born January 20, 1960) is an Uzbek military leader who was the Minister of Defence of Uzbekistan from September 4, 2017, to February 11, 2019. He now serves as head of the State Security Service.

Biography 
Azizov was born on January 20, 1960, in Tashkent. He formerly served in the ranks of the Soviet Army. He graduated from the Tashkent Police School (now the Academy of the Ministry of Internal Affairs of Uzbekistan). From 1982 to 2001, he served in the Main Department of Internal Affairs of the city of Tashkent from the inspector of the checkpoint to the first deputy chief of the GUVD. In 2001-2002, he was the head of the Central Internal Affairs Directorate of the city of Tashkent. From 2002 to 2006, he was chairman of the national holding company Uzbekneftegaz. From September 2006 to November 2008, Azizov was the General Director of Uzneftprodukt (a subsidiary of Uzbekneftegaz). In November 2008 he returned to work at the Ministry of Internal Affairs and in the winter of the same year he served as Deputy Minister of Internal Affairs Bakhodyr Matlyubov, from December 2008 to December 2009 he was First Deputy Minister of Internal Affairs of the Republic of Uzbekistan Bakhodyr Matlyubov. From 2008 to 2009, he was simultaneously one of the vice presidents of the Uzbekistan Football Association. In 2009-2017 he was the head of the Internal Affairs Directorate in the Jizzakh region.

After the death of former President of Uzbekistan Islam Karimov and Shavkat Mirziyoyev coming to power in his place, on January 4, 2017, Azizov was appointed Minister of Internal Affairs instead of Adham Ahmedbaev. 10 days after being appointed Minister of the Interior, he was awarded the title of Major General. As the Minister of Internal Affairs, Azizov participated in a radical reform of the Ministry of Internal Affairs of Uzbekistan towards transparency and openness, abolished the term “police” and established the phrase “Internal Affairs Bodies of the Republic of Uzbekistan” instead. On September 4, 2017, Azizov was relieved of his post as Minister of Internal Affairs and appointed by President Mirziyoyev as Minister of Defense to replace Qobul Berdiyev. In January 2019, Azizov was awarded the rank of Lieutenant General. On February 11, he was relieved of his post of Minister of Defense and appointed chairman of the State Security Service instead of Ihtiyor Abdullayev. Since July 15, 2019, he also became the president of the Football Association of Uzbekistan and promised to destroy contractual matches and corruption in Uzbek football.

Has 2 daughters 1 son. The son is married to the daughter of the former Deputy Minister of the Ministry of Internal Affairs.

References 

1967 births
Uzbekistani politicians
Uzbekistani military personnel
Living people
Defence Ministers of Uzbekistan